Pogrebitsky is a rural locality (a khutor) in Veydelevsky District, Belgorod Oblast, Russia. The population was 741 as of 2010. There is 1 street.

Geography 
Pogrebitsky is located 41 km northeast of Veydelevka (the district's administrative centre) by road. Lugovoye is the nearest rural locality.

References 

Rural localities in Veydelevsky District